Robertson Aircraft Corporation was a post-World War I American aviation service company based at the Lambert-St. Louis Flying Field near St. Louis, Missouri, that flew passengers and U.S. Air Mail, gave flying lessons, and performed exhibition flights. It also modified, re-manufactured, and resold surplus military aircraft including Standard J, Curtiss Jenny/Canuck, DeHavilland DH-4, Curtiss Oriole, Spad, Waco, and Travel Air types in addition to Curtiss OX-5 engines.

RAC also operated facilities in Kansas City, San Antonio, Houston, New Orleans, and Fort Wayne. The company was owned and operated by brothers Maj. William B. Robertson (1893–1943) and Frank H. Robertson (1898–1938) who were both former US Army aviators. William Robertson left the company in 1928 to form the Curtiss-Robertson division of Curtiss-Wright to produce aircraft such as the Curtiss Robin, which RAC sold.

Mail and air carrier operations
On April 15, 1926, Robertson Aircraft started Contract Air Mail service over route CAM-2 from Lambert Field to Chicago, with stops in Springfield, Illinois and Peoria, Illinois; Charles Lindbergh was employed as chief pilot for the service. RAC started service with four converted DH-4 aircraft (#s 109-112) acquired from the U.S. Postal Service's Air Mail fleet two of which were lost in accidents in September and November, 1926, while being piloted by Lindbergh. In 1927, Slonnie Sloniger was hired and took over Lindbergh's CAM-2 route. RAC added service over CAM-29 between St.Louis and Omaha in May 1929. By 1928 RAC was providing daily passenger and express service as well over the St. Louis - Chicago mail route flown in 12-passenger Stout Ford Tri-Motors. During the Great Depression Robertson's flight operations were merged into Universal Aviation Corporation along with Continental Airlines, Northern Air Lines, and Paul R. Braniff Inc., which became Braniff International Airways Universal Aviation became a component of The Aviation Corporation in 1930, merging many companies into American Airways in 1934, eventually becoming American Airlines. RAC's Sloniger would be named chief pilot and hold pilot seniority #1 at the newly created American Airlines.

Glider crash (1943)
On August 1, 1943 an "all St. Louis-built" WACO CG-4A-RO military troop and cargo transport glider (S/N 42-78839) built under license by RAC suffered in-flight structural failure and crashed during a demonstration flight at Lambert Field in St. Louis before a Sunday afternoon air show crowd of over 5,000 people when its right wing separated shortly after it had been released at about 2,000 feet by its Army C-47 tow plane killing all ten souls on board. The glider was flown by CPT Milton C. Klugh (pilot) and PFC Jack W. Davis (co-pilot/mechanic) of the USAAF 71st Troop Carrier Command, and the eight VIP passengers were St. Louis Mayor William D. Becker, RAC President Maj William B. Robertson, RAC VP/Chief Engineer Harold A. Krueger,  Deputy City Comptroller Charles L. Cunningham, St. Louis Army Air Forces Material Command Supervisor LTC Paul H. Hazelton, Director of Public Utilities Max H. Doyne, St. Louis County Court Presiding Judge Henry L. Mueller, and St. Louis Chamber of Commerce President Thomas N. Dysart. James Robertson, the 17-year-old son of Maj Robertson, had been a passenger on a successful test flight of the glider made immediately before the fatal flight. The failed wing strut component, which had been manufactured by Robertson subcontractor Gardner Metal Products Company of St. Louis, a firm that normally built metal caskets, was found to be made of metal that was too thin for the purpose.

Aircraft

Pop Culture
The 1957 motion picture The Spirit of St. Louis featured an RAC DH-4 mailplane in flying sequences as well as Maj. Robertson (played by James Robertson, Jr.) and company Air Mail pilots Lindbergh (James Stewart) and Harlan A. "Bud" Gurney (Murray Hamilton) among its characters.

References

Bibliography

Defunct aircraft manufacturers of the United States
St. Louis Lambert International Airport
Defunct companies based in Missouri